Scapa may refer to:

 Scapa distillery, a Scottish distillery
 Scapa Flow, a body of water in Scotland
Scapa Society (Society for Checking the Abuses in Public Advertising), UK society founded 1893
 Supermarine Scapa, an aircraft

People with the name
James R. Scapa, founder of Altair Engineering

See also
Scapa Flow (disambiguation)